David Zalkaliani (born 27 February 1968) is a Georgian career diplomat serving as the Ambassador of Georgia to the United States. From June 21, 2018 to April 4, 2022 he served as the Minister of Foreign Affairs of Georgia. From January 21, 2021 to April 4, 2022 he was also Deputy Prime Minister of Georgia.

Career 
Soon after Georgia regained its independence in 1992, Zalkaliani joined the Ministry of Foreign Affairs, serving as an Attaché in the Department of International Organizations, being subsequently promoted to the Deputy Head of the Division at the same department in 1995.

During the aforementioned period, it was of utmost importance for Georgia to claim a place of its own within the system of international relations, by joining appropriate international organizations. During the same period Georgia started cooperating with the European Community, which in 1992 recognized Georgia's independence. Back in those years, cooperation between Georgia and the European Community was mainly focused on humanitarian and technical issues, in which Zalkaliani was actively involved.

From 1996 to 2000, Zalkaliani served as a Counsellor at the Embassy of Georgia to the Republic of Austria and the Permanent Mission of Georgia to the OSCE and International Organization’s in Vienna. He took part in the negotiating process on the text of the Agreement on Adaptation of the Treaty on Conventional Armed Forces in Europe. He participated in various important high-level summits, including the Budapest Summit of 1994, the Lisbon Summit of 1996 and the Istanbul Summit of 1999. Zalkaliani actively participated in the process of negotiations for the withdrawal of Russian military bases from the territory of Georgia. During Zalkaliani's diplomatic tenure in Austria, the Georgian mission in Vienna was represented by the prominent Georgian diplomat, Ambassador Levan Mikeladze. Later, Zalkaliani joined Mikeladze, when Mikeladze became actively involved in social and political activities.

In 2000–2001, he continued serving as a Counsellor at the Department for European Affairs of the Ministry of Foreign Affairs of Georgia. Thus, the vital and highly responsible task of deepening bilateral cooperation with European countries fell under his duties.

In 2001–2002, Zalkaliani returned to Vienna to assume the position of Deputy Permanent Representative of Georgia to the OSCE.

In 2002–2004, Zalkaliani served as a Senior Counsellor at the Embassy of Georgia to the U.S., Mexico and Canada; during his tenure, US-Georgia defense cooperation was considerably intensified.

In 2004 Zalkaliani continued his diplomatic career in Uzbekistan having served as an Ambassador Extraordinary and Plenipotentiary of Georgia to the Republics of Uzbekistan and Tajikistan. In the above period the bilateral relations between the countries were considerably intensified in the political and economic fields.  

In 2007 Zalkaliani was appointed as the Director of the Department of Global Relations of the Ministry of Foreign Affairs of Georgia. Over the next year he assumed the position of the Ambassador-at-large.

In 2008 he was appointed as an Ambassador Extraordinary and Plenipotentiary of Georgia to the Republic of Belarus.

In 2009 Zalkaliani left his position as an Ambassador and entered politics along a group of like-minded people. He actively participated in the creation of the political party – “Free Democrats”, that was followed by the victory of the “Georgian Dream” coalition in 2012 parliamentary elections. Afterwards the “Georgian dream – Free Democrats” parliamentary faction was established. The same year Zalkaliani becomes First Deputy Minister of Foreign Affairs.

Since his appointment as the first Deputy Minister of Foreign Affairs, along with other important directions, David Zalkaliani has been actively engaged in the process of preparation of the Georgia-EU Association Agreement, acting as the Chief Negotiator on Georgia’s behalf. Negotiations were successfully concluded on the 27th of June of 2014 with the ceremonious signing of the Association Agreement, between the European Union and Georgia, including the Deep and Comprehensive Free Trade Area (DCFTA) component. From 2012 to 2014 Zalkaliani was a Chief Negotiator from the Georgian side in the Geneva International Discussions and the Co-Chair of working groups of U.S.-Georgia Charter on Strategic Partnership.

In 2015 Zalkaliani continued his diplomatic career as an executive director in the newly founded Levan Mikeladze Foundation. During his tenure, his activities included, inter alia, research of public politics, and advocacy projects implementation, capacity building for diplomats, holding academic and public discussions on foreign policy priorities. 

In 2016 David Zalkaliani once again assumed the position of the First Deputy Minister of Foreign Affairs and on the 21st of June of 2018 was promoted to the position of the Minister of Foreign Affairs of Georgia.

On January 21, 2021, Foreign Minister David Zalkaliani was appointed as Vice Prime Minister of Georgia.

On April 4, 2022, Prime Minister Irakli Garibashvili announced Zalkaliani’s departure from the government and his appointment as the ambassador to the United States.

Diplomatic Rank 
In 2007 Zalkaliani was granted the diplomatic rank of Ambassador Extraordinary and Plenipotentiary.

Education 
In 1992 he graduated from Ivane Javakhishvili Tbilisi State University majoring in international law. He is fluent in English and Russian.

Family 
Zalkaliani is married and has two daughters.

References

External links

 Official Biography at Ministry of Foreign Affairs Website 

Ambassadors of Georgia (country) to the United States
Foreign Ministers of Georgia
1968 births
Living people
Georgian Dream politicians
21st-century politicians from Georgia (country)
Diplomats from Tbilisi
Tbilisi State University alumni
Ambassadors of Georgia (country) to Uzbekistan
Ambassadors of Georgia (country) to Tajikistan
Ambassadors of Georgia (country) to Belarus